The Re-entry Permit (Form I-327) is a travel document similar to a certificate of identity, issued by the United States Citizenship and Immigration Services to U.S. lawful permanent residents to allow them to travel abroad and return to the United States. It is a passport-like booklet with a blue-green cover with the words Travel Document displayed prominently on its cover. Individuals whose application for permanent residency has not yet been approved can instead apply for advance parole (Form I-512).

Purpose
The main purpose of the re-entry permit is to allow permanent residents to leave the United States for an extended amount of time without jeopardizing their permanent resident status. For short trips abroad of up to one year, the Permanent Resident Card itself allows re-entry to the United States. Permanent residents must maintain their permanent residence in the United States, else they may lose their permanent residency. Even for trips abroad of less than one year, permanent residents may be questioned as to whether they have maintained residence in the United States. Any trip abroad for one year or more automatically causes permanent residence to be lost. If a U.S. permanent resident intends to take a long trip abroad, he/she may apply for a re-entry permit. It is issued for up to two years. It establishes that the permanent resident did not intend to abandon permanent resident status.

Another purpose for the re-entry permit is to serve as an international travel document in lieu of a passport for U.S. permanent residents who are stateless, who cannot get a passport from their country, or who wish to travel to a place where they cannot use their passport. A permanent resident who obtained permanent residence as a refugee may either apply for a refugee travel document or a re-entry permit, but not both.

USCIS Form I-131 (Application for a Travel Document) is used to apply for the re-entry permit and other travel documents. A re-entry permit can only be applied for while the applicant is inside the United States.

Acceptance 
, Schengen Area countries which have explicitly indicated to the Council of the European Union's Visa Working Party that they will accept the U.S. Re-entry Permit for visa issuance purposes include Belgium, the Netherlands, Luxembourg, the Czech Republic, Denmark, Germany, Estonia, Greece, Spain, France, Italy, Latvia, Lithuania, Hungary, Austria, Portugal, Slovenia, Slovakia, Finland, Sweden, Iceland, Norway, Switzerland, and Liechtenstein; Slovakia has explicitly indicated they will accept it, while other countries did not provide any information on their acceptance of it. Said Re-entry Permit is stated as an "Alien's Travel Document".

See also
 1954 Convention Travel Document
 1954 Convention Relating to the Status of Stateless Persons
 1961 Convention on the Reduction of Statelessness
 Nansen passport

References

Identity documents of the United States
International travel documents